Auriporia pileata is a species of poroid fungus. Found in East Asia, it was described as a new species in 1980 by Czech mycologist Erast Parmasto.

References

Fomitopsidaceae
Fungi described in 1980
Fungi of Asia